Hato Del Yaque is a municipal district in the province of Santiago, Dominican Republic. 
Its urban centre is located 10 km west of the city of Santiago de los caballeros. 
Hato del yaque had a population of 25,816 people in 2002. The population of its urban center in 2002 was 18,354 people.
 
In 1979 Hurricane David destroyed many homes alongside the river in the city of Santiago. Most of those people were relocated in what is now the town of Hato del Yaque.

Information 
 Area: 39.3 km2 /  15.17 mi2
 Population as 2002: 25,816
 Urban Population: 18,354
 Rural Population: 7,462
 Mayor: Gernaro A. Diaz

Subdivisions 
The municipal district of Hato del Yaque is subdivided into four Secciones (or Sectors, which are subdivided into Barrios (or Neighborhoods), and or rural villages.
Hato del Yaque is subdivided into:  
 Hato del Yaque
 Hato del Yaque Arriba
 Aciba
 Guayacanal

Neighborhoods 
The town of Hato del Yaque is Subdivided into the following neighborhoods.
 Monseñor Eliseo Pérez Sánchez
 Villa Progreso
 Urb. Dr. Grullón
 La Mina
 Hermanas Mirabal
 El Tamarindo
 San Antonio
 La Paz
 Las Colinas
 Los Jiménez
 El Portón
 Los Letreros
 El Porton
 La Rinconada
 Barrio Balaguer
 Tres Pasitos
 Villa Fatima
 Los Guandules
 Villa Bao
 Brisas del Yaque
 Cerros del Yaque
 Praderas del Yaque

website:  Hatodelyaque.com

Populated places in Santiago Province (Dominican Republic)